Bad Blood (stylised as "BΔD BLOOD") is the debut studio album by English band Bastille. It was released on 4 March 2013 in the United Kingdom, and on 3 September 2013 in the United States, and features the singles "Overjoyed", "Bad Blood", "Flaws", "Pompeii", "Laura Palmer", "Things We Lost in the Fire" and "Oblivion". The album was recorded in London and produced by Mark Crew and the band's lead singer Dan Smith.

The record debuted at number one on the UK Albums Chart, has spent three non-consecutive weeks at the top, and is certified triple platinum in the UK. It has also charted on the US Billboard 200, as well as in several other countries.

An extended version of the album, All This Bad Blood, was released on 25 November 2013, and featured the single "Of the Night".

It was nominated for British Album of the Year at the 2014 BRIT Awards.

Background 
The band initially included two other musicians on violin and cello, but dwindled down to the four current members. Smith, Wood, Farquarson, and Simmons played together before the band was started, but all of their first songs were written and recorded by Smith. On 4 July 2011 they released their debut single "Flaws"/"Icarus" through London-based independent record label Young & Lost Club, released on 7" vinyl limited to 300 copies. The single now can sell for over £300. In late 2011 they self-released their debut EP Laura Palmer as a digital download and on CD.

They signed to Virgin Records and released their second single "Overjoyed", but due to little promotion for the single, it failed to chart. In early 2012, they also released the mixtape Other People's Heartache as a free download, which featured covers of various different songs. They began recording their debut album in June 2012, which Dan Smith said "we basically made the album in a studio the size of a cupboard, so it was one extreme to the other." They released a third single, "Bad Blood", in August 2012, which managed to chart a number 90 in the UK Singles Chart. In late 2012 they released Other People's Heartache Pt 2, and had finished recording their debut album, but were deciding on the track list. They re-released "Flaws" in October 2012 on vinyl and digital download, which managed to chart at number 21 in the UK Singles Chart. In support of the single's release, they headlined their short Flaws Tour.

Release and promotion 

Bad Blood was announced in January 2013, along with the track listing, as well as the next single "Pompeii". "Pompeii" was released in February 2013 on vinyl and as a digital download, and debuted at number 2 on the UK Singles Chart, as well as number 5 in the US Billboard Hot 100 and number 1 on the Alternative Songs chart. The single has been certified platinum in the UK, and double platinum in the US. Bad Blood was released on 4 March in the UK, and debuted at number 1 in the UK Albums Chart. On 11 March, Bastille were announced to be playing at Leeds and Reading Festival in August 2013.

In an interview with Digital Spy in March 2013, "Laura Palmer" was revealed to be the fifth single to be released from the album, by lead vocalist, Dan Smith. It was released on 3 June 2013, and an accompanying video for the track premiered through the band's official VEVO page on 12 April 2013. The group joined English rock band Muse as a supporting act on their The 2nd Law Tour in May 2013 and did so again in June 2013. In May 2013, Bastille released their Haunt EP in the US via iTunes. On Saturday 6 July the band headlined their first UK summer music festival at Blissfields. On 24 August 2013, "Things We Lost in the Fire" was released as sixth and the last single from the band's debut album. A music video for the song was shot in Vilnius and Kėdainiai, Lithuania. It charted in September 2013 at number 28 in the UK Singles Chart, and number 47 in the US Billboard Hot Rock Songs. The album was released in the US on 3 September, and debuted at number 11 on the Billboard 200.

Bad Blood was re-issued on 25 November 2013 as a double album called All This Bad Blood. The first disc is a reissue of Bad Blood, and the second disc is split into two parts, titled All This Bad Blood and Other People's Heartache. All This Bad Blood contains four songs which were previously released as B-sides from the singles of Bad Blood: "Haunt (Demo)", "Sleepsong", "Durban Skies" and "Poet". "Weight of Living Pt. I", "The Silence" and "Laughter Lines" were featured on The Extended Cut version of Bad Blood. Other People's Heartache is a selection from the Bastille's two mixtapes, Other People's Heartache and Other People's Heartache, Pt. 2, and also contains two completely new tracks recorded in the last few weeks, "The Draw" and "Skulls". The lead single promoting the album, "Of the Night", was released on 11 October 2013. The song is a mash-up of "The Rhythm of the Night" by Corona and "Rhythm Is a Dancer" by Snap!. An accompanying music video for the single, directed by Dave Ma and starring James Russo, was released on 9 October 2013. "Of the Night" debuted at number 2 on the UK Singles Chart, and has also charted in several other countries.

The band performed on Saturday Night Live on 25 January 2014. In February 2014, Bastille won the BRIT Award for Best Breakthrough Act, as well as being nominated for Best British Group, Single of the Year for "Pompeii" and Album of the Year. They performed a remixed version of "Pompeii" with Rudimental and their song "Waiting All Night" at the ceremony, which was released digitally and charted at number 21 in the UK. Two hours after their appearance, sales of Bad Blood were up by 132% and "Pompeii" had climbed 29 places in the singles chart. Bad Blood then went at number 1 again for two weeks, and has since gone double platinum. In March 2014, "Flaws" was re-released for a third time but as a radio-only single. On 1 April 2014, the Official Charts Company announced that Bad Blood was the biggest selling digital album of 2013, and the eleventh biggest selling album in the over-all Official Artist Albums Top 40 of 2013. As of December 2014, the album has sold 730,001 copies in the UK. "Oblivion" was released as the eighth and final single, and on 21 July the video for the song was released on their Vevo account.

All This Bad Blood was released as a limited edition 2LP for Record Store Day 2020, for the first time on 29 August 2020.

Critical reception

Bad Blood has received mixed reviews from music critics. At Metacritic, which assigns a normalised rating out of 100 to reviews from mainstream critics, the album received an average score of 58, based on 12 reviews.

In an enthusiastic review for DIY, Sarah Jamieson called the band's frontman Dan Smith "a storyteller" and "a magnificent musician," adding that "his music is a thrilling example of what great pop music can achieve." She wrote, "The beautiful part about Bad Blood is that it is both entirely predictable yet completely disarming. (...) The exploration of any and all sounds; the delicate use of strings to heighten emotion, the touching piano-based 'Oblivion'. There are moments, instruments, timings, buried within his experimentation that take you entirely by surprise."

Brice Ezell of PopMatters compared the band to the sound of Coldplay in a positive review and wrote, "booming male choirs, string effects, echoey pianos, allusions to Greek mythology and the Bible – Bastille brings out all the artillery on Bad Blood, and the result is nothing less than earth-shattering." He called it a "debut that's as infectious as it is dramatically powerful."

BBC's Matthew Horton wrote that "Smith and Bastille really deliver, ranging earworm choruses across the album. There's something 80s about the heart-swelling melodies of 'Oblivion' and the glorious 'Weight of Living, Pt. II', but only because they evoke a-ha and Tears for Fears in their determination to be both catchy and muscular."

In a less positive review, Jamie Fullerton of NME magazine wrote that "Bastille want everyone to like them," attributing different songs from the album to various "target markets" the group seemed to be aiming at, such as fans of Arcade Fire, Coldplay or Ed Sheeran. Fullerton commented, "Alas, all this greedy grasping means the London newcomers can't really get a firm grip on anything, meaning Bad Blood comes out with about as much identity as a Facebook commenter without a profile picture."

Michael Hann of The Guardian gave the album two out of five stars and wrote, "By bolting on the merest hint of dance beats to his [Dan Smith's] absolutely conventional, mildly melancholic piano ballads (descending chord sequences, the internationally recognised signifier of mild melancholy, abound), he has spruced up the formula that has dominated mainstream pop-rock for more than a decade. That said, it's hard to work out why these songs have made a greater connection than those of a hundred like-minded songwriters."

The album was ranked at number three on Digital Spy's list of top of albums 2013.

Track listing
All songs written by Dan Smith.

Bad Blood

All This Bad Blood

Personnel
Credits adapted from AllMusic.

Bastille
Dan Smith – Lead vocals, keyboards, piano, percussion, string arrangements, production, programming
Kyle Simmons – Keyboards, percussion, backing vocals
Will Farquarson – Bass, keyboards, acoustic guitar, electric guitar, backing vocals
Chris "Woody" Wood – Drums, percussion, backing vocals

Technical personnel 
 Mark Crew – Mixing, production, programming
 Mark 'Spike' Stent – Mixing
 Matty Green – Assistant mixing
 Bob Ludwig – Mastering
 Naweed Ahmed – Mastering
 Nick Burgess – A&R
 Polly Comber (Black Fox Management) – Management
 Josh Smith (Black Fox Management) – Management

Additional musicians
 Mark Crew – Keyboards, string arrangements
 Verity Evanson – Cello, string arrangements
 Juliet Lee – Violin
 Sophie Lockett – Violin
 Gemma Sharples – Violin
 Willemijn Steenbakkers – Violin
 Alexandra Urquhart – Viola
 Richard Phillips – Cello
 Dave DeRose – Drums
 Ian Dudfield – Backing vocals
 Ralph Pelleymounter – Backing vocals
 Josh Platman – Backing vocals
 Jon Willoughby – Backing vocals

Charts

Weekly charts

Year-end charts

Decade-end charts

Certifications

Release history

References

2013 debut albums
Bastille (band) albums
Virgin Records albums
Universal Music Group albums